The Electoral district of Monmouth was a single-member electoral district of the Tasmanian House of Assembly. It was based in the rural hinterland to the north of the state capital, Hobart.

The seat was created in a redistribution ahead of the 1903 state election out of the former seats of Brighton and Richmond, and was abolished when the Tasmanian parliament adopted the Hare-Clark electoral model in 1909. It had a single member during its existence, Thomas Hodgman.

Members for Monmouth

See also
Monmouth Land District

References
 
 
 Parliament of Tasmania (2006). The Parliament of Tasmania from 1956

Monmouth